Park Street railway station serves the village of Park Street, Hertfordshire, England. It is the penultimate station on the Abbey Line. The station and all trains serving it are operated by London Northwestern Railway.

History

The station opened as Park Street & Frogmore in 1858, when the London and North Western Railway built its branch line from Watford Junction to St Albans.  It was not an immediate success, and was closed from 1859 until 1861.  It had been relocated to its present position by the 1890s. The station was renamed Park Street on 6 May 1974.

It is now a simple unstaffed halt, like all the other stations on the line.

Services
All services at Park Street are operated by London Northwestern Railway. This is increased to a train approximately every 45 minutes in each direction during the peak hours. Services are typically operated using  EMUs.

Future
In December 2017 responsibility for the branch line passed from London Midland to London Northwestern Railway. Installation of Oyster Card readers on the stations along the branch is a possibility, although there are other ticketing options too.

Restoration of the crossing loop at Bricket Wood is being considered by the local authorities and Network Rail, which would facilitate trains running every 30 minutes.

References

Notes

Sources
 
 
Abbeyline.org.uk

External links

Video about the station by Geoff Marshall, published in 2016

Railway stations in Hertfordshire
Former London and North Western Railway stations
Railway stations in Great Britain opened in 1858
Railway stations in Great Britain closed in 1858
Railway stations in Great Britain closed in 1890
Railway stations in Great Britain opened in 1890
Railway stations served by West Midlands Trains